Beer in Hungary has been brewed for well over a thousand years and the country has a significant history of commercial beer production.

Etymology 

The Hungarian word for beer is sör. The word itself is of Oghuric origin. The word was most probably borrowed by the Hungarians in the era before the conquest of Hungary.

History 

The first commercial brewery in Hungary was established in Buda in 1845 by Peter Schmidt. During the heyday of the Austro-Hungarian Empire, the Kőbánya district of Budapest became the centre of Hungary's brewing industry. The Dreher brewery is named after Anton Dreher, the creator of the Vienna lager style. He created the brewery in Budapest in 1862 and it came to dominate the Hungarian market before the Second World War.

Breweries 

Today, Hungary has four large commercial brewers which produce mainly light lagers and German-style dark beers (bocks).

Lately, some microbreweries have also set up in Hungary, such as Fóti, Legenda, Monyó, Csupor or Mad Scientist. In the 2010s, a lively craft beer scene evolved, with numerous local breweries, festivals and bottleshops.

Economy 

In the 1980s, beer consumption was roughly 100 litres per person, but since then it has declined to nearer seventy.Pale lager has about 90% of sales.

Culture 

In Hungary, people traditionally do not clink their glasses or mugs when drinking beer. There is an urban legend in Hungarian culture that Austrian generals clinked their beer glasses to celebrate the execution of the 13 Martyrs of Arad in 1849. Many people still follow the tradition, although younger people often disavow it, citing that the vow was only meant to last 150 years.

See also 

 Beer and breweries by region
National symbols of Hungary

References

External links 

 
Beer